

France
 Afars and Issas
 Commissioner – 
 Christian Dablanc, High Commissioner of the Afars and Issas (1974–1976)
 Camille d'Ornano, High Commissioner of the Afars and Issas (1976–1977)
 Governing Council – 
 Ali Aref Bourhan, President of the Governing Council (1967–1976)
 Abdallah Mohamed Kamil, President of the Governing Council (1976–1977)

United Kingdom
 Ellice Islands – 
 Commissioner – Thomas Laying, Commissioner of Ellice Island (1975–1978)
 Prime Minister – Toaripi Lauti, Chief Minister of Ellice Islands (1975–1978)
 Hong Kong
Governor – Lord MacLehose of Beoch, Governor of Hong Kong, (1971–1982)

United States
 Guam
 Governor – Ricardo Bordallo, Governor of Guam (1975–1979)

Colonial governors
Colonial governors
1976